"Mazer in Prison" is a  science fiction story by American writer Orson Scott Card, set in his Ender's Game universe.  It tells the story of how Mazer Rackham and Hyrum Graff started Battle School.  It appears in Card's Webzine InterGalactic Medicine Show.

Plot summary
"Mazer in Prison" is the story of Mazer Rackham, the hero who saved the planet Earth in the second Formics invasion.  As soon as the battle was over, Earth put together a fleet to send to the Formics home worlds to end the conflict once and for all.  Since they needed a leader for this war, the Earth government decided to send Mazer out into space in a craft that was capable of near-lightspeed travel so that due to the relativistic effect he would return still young enough to lead the fleet into battle.  Since he knew that he was not the best person to lead the fleet, Mazer reprogrammed the computer on board his ship so that the Earth government would no longer be able to control it.  He then forced them to find a new fleet commander and arranged to have a young Hyrum Graff set up the Battle School to train possible candidates.

Characters
Admiral Mazer Rackham
Kim Arnsbrach Rackham Summers - Mazer's ex-wife
Pahu Rangi - Mazer's son
Pai Mahutanga - Mazer’s daughter
Kahui Kura (English name Mirth) - Pai Mahutanga's daughter
Pao Pao Te Rangi (English name Glad) - Pai Mahutanga's daughter
Mazer Taka Aho Howarth - Pai Mahutanga's son
Struan Maeroero - Pai Mahutanga's infant son
Lieutenant Hyrum Graff - later promoted to captain

Audio
In addition to the text version of the story, "Mazer in Prison" is also available from InterGalactic Medicine Show as an audio download.  The story was read by Audie Award winner Stefan Rudnicki.

Publication
"Mazer in Prison" was published in the October 2005 issue of Intergalactic Medicine Show.  It also appears in the anthology Orson Scott Card's InterGalactic Medicine Show.  It was also published in Subterranean Press's Subterranean Magazine Issue #5. It was included in the 2009 "Federations" anthology of John Joseph Adams.

References

Ender's Game series short stories
Short stories by Orson Scott Card
Works originally published in InterGalactic Medicine Show